Reza Abedini (born 1967 in Tehran) is an Iranian graphic designer and a professor. His works keep a modern theme as he blends traditional Islamic patterns, calligraphy and culture. He combines simple illustrations with poetic typography and elegant layouts, exploring the beauty of the Persian language. He is also an art critic, independent art director with Reza Abedini Studio and the editor-in-chief of Manzar magazine in Iran.

Early life 
He graduated in 1985 from the School of Fine Arts in Tehran, majoring in graphic design. He went on to get a second degree and majored in painting from the Tehran University of Art and earned a Bachelor of Arts degree in 1992. Upon graduating until 1993 he was the Editor of the visual section of Sureh Monthly Magazine. In 1993, he founded Reza Abedini Studio an independent design consultancy and art direction studio.

Design 
His design influences include Aleksander Rodchenko, Ikko Tanaka, Sani'ol Molk Ghafari, Roman Cieslewicz and Mirza Gholam-Reza Esfahani.

Abedini has won dozens of national and international design awards. In 2006, he received the Principal Prince Claus Award in recognition of his personal creativity in the production of special graphic designs, as well as for the personal manner in which he applies and redefines the knowledge and accomplishments of Iran's artistic heritage, thus making them highly interesting. The award also focuses attention on the diversity of both the historical and the modern Iranian culture, recognizing the impact of graphic design as an influential international means of communication.

Abedini is a member of the Iranian Graphic Designers Society since 1997, he was a member of jury at several biennials throughout the world. His name is listed in Meggs History of Graphic Design, as one of the world's outstanding post digital graphic designers.

Academic career 
Since 1996, he has been a professor at the University of Tehran in graphic design and visual culture. He previously was a visiting assistant professor of graphic design and visual culture at the American University of Beirut.

Honors and awards 

1993, 1994, 1996 – First Prize: best film poster of Fajr International Film Festival Iran
1994 – Film Critics Special Award for the Best film poster, Iran
1996 – IRIB’S Special Award: The Best film poster, Iran
1999 – 3rd Award: poster, The 6th Biennial of Iranian Graphic Designers, Tehran
1999 – Special Award: Creativity from Iranian Graphic Designers Society, Tehran
2003 – Special Prize: China International Poster Biennale China
2004 – The Union of Visual Artists of the Czech Republic Award, Brno, Czech
2004 – Second prize: 15th Festival d'affiches de Chaumont France
2004 – Gold Prize: Hong Kong International Poster Triennial Hong Kong
2004 – First prize and gold medal: 8th International Biennial of the Poster in Mexico
2004 – Silver prize: Second International Poster Biennale Korea
2004 – First prize: The First international Biennale of the Islamic world Poster, Iran
2005 – Bronze Medal: The 2nd China International Poster Biennial CIPB, China
2005 – First prize: 9th Press Festival of Children & Young Adults, Iran
 2006 – Principal award, Prince Claus Award, Netherlands

Bibliography 
 Reza Abedini (Vision of Design) by Jianping He
 Reza Abedini (design & designer)  by Alain le Quernec
 New Visual Culture of Modern Iran  by Reza Abedini and Hans Wolbers
 Iran. Gnomi e giganti, paradossi e malintesi  by Reza Abedini and Ebrahim Nabavi

See also 
Other Iranian Prince Claus Award winners
Rakhshan Bani-Etemad
Ebrahim Nabavi

Notes

External links 
 Reza Abedini's Official Website
 Reza Abedini won Prince Claus Award

Iranian graphic designers
Iranian typographers and type designers
Iranian expatriate academics
Academic staff of the University of Tehran
Art educators
Writers from Tehran
1967 births
Living people
Iranian poster artists